The Komagata Maru incident involved the Japanese steamship Komagata Maru, on which a group of people from British India attempted to immigrate to Canada in April 1914, but most were denied entry and forced to return to Budge Budge, Calcutta (present-day Kolkata). There, the Indian Imperial Police attempted to arrest the group leaders. A riot ensued, and they were fired upon by the police, resulting in the deaths of 22 people.

Komagata Maru sailed from British Hong Kong, via Shanghai, China, and Yokohama, Japan, to Vancouver, British Columbia, Canada, on April 4, 1914, carrying 376 passengers from Punjab province in British India. The passengers comprised 337 Sikhs, 27 Muslims and 12 Hindus, all Punjabis and British subjects. Of these 376 passengers, 24 were admitted to Canada, but the other 352 were not allowed to disembark in Canada, and the ship was forced to leave Canadian waters. This was one of several incidents in the early 20th century in which exclusion laws in Canada and the United States were used to exclude immigrants of Asian origin.

Immigration controls in Canada

The Canadian government's first attempt to restrict immigration from British India was an Order in Council passed on January 8, 1908, that prohibited immigration of persons who "in the opinion of the Minister of the Interior" did not "come from the country of their birth or citizenship by a continuous journey and or through tickets purchased before leaving their country of their birth or nationality". In practice this continuous journey regulation applied only to ships that began their voyage in India, as the great distance usually necessitated a stopover in Japan or Hawaii. These regulations came at a time when Canada was accepting huge numbers of immigrants, almost all of whom came from Europe. More than 400,000 arrived in 1913, an annual figure that has not been equalled since.  Race relations in Vancouver had been strained in the years before the arrival of the Komagata Maru, culminating in the Anti-Oriental Riots of 1907.

Gurdit Singh's initial idea

Gurdit Singh Sandhu, from Sarhali (not to be confused with Gurdit Singh Jawanda from Haripur Khalsa, a 1906 Indo-Canadian immigration pioneer), was a Singaporean businessman who was aware that Canadian exclusion laws were preventing Punjabis from immigrating there. He wanted to circumvent these laws by hiring a ship to sail from Calcutta to Vancouver. His aim was to help his compatriots whose previous journeys to Canada had been blocked.

Though Gurdit Singh was apparently aware of regulations when he chartered the ship Komagata Maru in January 1914, he continued with his enterprise in order to challenge the continuous journey regulation, in the hope of opening the door for immigration from India to Canada.

At the same time, in January 1914, he publicly espoused the Ghadarite cause while in Hong Kong. The Ghadar Movement was an organization founded by Punjab residents of the United States and Canada in June 1913 with the aim of gaining India independence from British rule. It was also known as the Khalsa Association of the Pacific Coast.

Passengers
The passengers consisted of 340 Sikhs, 24 Muslims, and 12 Hindus, all British subjects. One of the Sikh passengers, Jagat Singh Thind, was the youngest brother of Bhagat Singh Thind, an Indian-American Sikh writer and lecturer on "spiritual science" who was involved in an important legal battle over the rights of Indians to obtain U.S. citizenship (United States v. Bhagat Singh Thind).

The Canadian Government was aware that amongst the passengers were a number of Indian nationalists intent on creating disorder in support of efforts to overthrow British rule in India. (see Ghadar conspiracy, Annie Larsen arms plot, and Christmas Day Plot.)  In addition to the security risks, there was a desire to prevent Indian nationals from immigrating to Canada.

Voyage

Departure from Hong Kong
Hong Kong became the point of departure. The ship was scheduled to leave in March, but Singh was arrested for selling tickets for an illegal voyage. After several months he was released on bail and given permission by Francis Henry May, the Governor of Hong Kong, to set sail. The ship departed on April 4 with 165 passengers. More passengers joined at Shanghai on April 8, and the ship arrived at Yokohama on April 14. It left Yokohama on May 3 with its complement of 376 passengers and sailed into Burrard Inlet, near Vancouver, on May 23. The Indian nationalist revolutionaries Barkatullah and Bhagwan Singh Gyanee met with the ship en route. Ghadarite literature was disseminated on board and political meetings took place on board. A passenger told a British officer:  "This ship belongs to the whole of India, this is a symbol of the honour of India and if this was detained, there would be mutiny in the armies".

Arrival in Vancouver

When Komagata Maru arrived in Canadian waters, first at Coal Harbour in Burrard Inlet some 200 meters (220 yards) off CPR Pier A, it was not allowed to dock. The first immigration officer to meet the ship in Vancouver was Fred "Cyclone" Taylor. While Prime Minister of Canada Robert Borden decided what to do with the ship, the Conservative Premier of British Columbia, Richard McBride, gave a categorical statement that the passengers would not be allowed to disembark. Conservative MP H. H. Stevens organized a public meeting against allowing the ship's passengers to disembark and urged the government to refuse to allow the ship to remain. Stevens worked with immigration official Malcolm R.J. Reid to keep the passengers offshore. Reid's intransigence, supported by Stevens, led to the mistreatment of the passengers on the ship and prolonged its departure date, which was not resolved until the intervention of the federal Minister of Agriculture, Martin Burrell, MP for Yale—Cariboo.

Some South Asian Canadians already settled in Canada began launching "shore committees" led by Husain Rahim (Gujarati-Canadian), Muhammad Akbar (Punjabi-Canadian) and Sohan Lal Pathak. These were to protest the decision that denied entry to the Komagata Maru passengers. Protest meetings were held in Canada and the United States. At one of these meetings held in Dominion Hall, Vancouver, the assembly resolved that if the passengers were not allowed entry into Canada, Indo-Canadians should follow them back to India to start a rebellion or Ghadar. A British government agent who infiltrated the meeting wired government officials in London and Ottawa to tell them that supporters of the Ghadar Party were on the ship.

The shore committee raised $22,000 as an installment for chartering the ship. They also launched a lawsuit under J. Edward Bird's legal counsel on behalf of Munshi Singh, one of the passengers. On July 6, the full bench of the British Columbia Court of Appeal delivered a unanimous judgement that under new orders-in-council it had no authority to interfere with the decisions of the Department of Immigration and Colonization. Angry passengers relieved the Japanese captain of control of the ship, but the Canadian government ordered the harbour tug Sea Lion to push the ship out to sea. On July 19, the angry passengers mounted an attack. The next day the Vancouver newspaper The Sun reported: "Howling masses of Hindus showered policemen with lumps of coal and bricks ... it was like standing underneath a coal chute".

Departure from Vancouver

The government also mobilized , a Royal Canadian Navy ship  under the command of Commander Hose, with troops from the 11th Regiment "Irish Fusiliers of Canada", 72nd Regiment "Seaforth Highlanders of Canada", and the 6th Regiment "The Duke of Connaught's Own Rifles". In the end, only twenty passengers were admitted to Canada, since the ship had violated the exclusion laws, the passengers did not have the required funds, and they had not sailed directly from India. The ship was turned around and forced to depart for Asia on July 23.

During the controversy, Punjabi residents of Canada had supplied information to W. C. Hopkinson, a British immigration official. Two of these informants were murdered in August 1914. Hopkinson was gunned down at the Vancouver courthouse while attending the Punjabi trials in October 1914.

Shooting on return to India
Komagata Maru arrived in Calcutta on September 27. Upon entry into the harbour, the ship was stopped by a British gunboat, and the passengers were placed under guard. The government of the British Raj saw the men on Komagata Maru not only as self-confessed lawbreakers, but also as dangerous political agitators. The British government suspected that white and South Asian radicals were using the incident to create rebellion among South Asians in the Pacific Northwest. When the ship docked at Budge Budge, the police went to arrest Baba Gurdit Singh and the twenty or so other men whom they viewed as leaders. He resisted arrest, a friend of his assaulted a policeman, and a general riot ensued. Shots were fired and nineteen of the passengers were killed. Some escaped, but the remainder were arrested and imprisoned or sent to their villages and kept under village arrest for the duration of the First World War. This incident became known as the Budge Budge riot.

Ringleader Gurdit Singh Sandhu managed to escape and lived in hiding until 1922. Mahatma Gandhi urged him to give himself up as a "true patriot". Upon his doing so he was imprisoned for five years.

Significance
The Komagata Maru incident was widely cited at the time by Indian groups to highlight discrepancies in Canadian immigration laws. Further, the inflamed passions in the wake of the incident were widely cultivated by the Indian revolutionary organization, the Ghadar Party, to rally support for its aims. In a number of meetings ranging from California in 1914 to the Indian diaspora, prominent Ghadarites including Barkatullah, Tarak Nath Das, and Sohan Singh used the incident as a rallying point to recruit members for the Ghadar movement, most notably in support of promulgating plans to coordinate a massive uprising in India. Their efforts failed due to lack of support from the general population.

Legacy

India

In 1952 the Indian government set up a memorial to the Komagata Maru martyrs near the Budge Budge. It was inaugurated by Indian Prime Minister Jawaharlal Nehru.

A tripartite agreement was signed between the Kolkata Port Trust, Union Ministry of Culture and the Komagata Maru Trust for the construction of a G+2 building behind the existing memorial. The building will house an administrative office and library in the ground floor, a museum in the first floor and auditorium in the second. The total cost of the construction will amount to 24 million Indian rupees (INR).

In 2014 government of India issued two special coins, INR 5 and INR 100, to mark the centenary of the Komagata Maru incident.

Canada
A plaque commemorating the 75th anniversary of the departure of Komagata Maru was placed in the Sikh gurdwara (temple) in Vancouver on July 23, 1989.

A plaque for the 75th anniversary also lies in Portal Park, at 1099 West Hastings Street, Vancouver.

A plaque commemorating the 80th anniversary of the arrival of Komagata Maru was placed in Vancouver harbour in 1994.

A monument in remembrance of the Komagata Maru incident was unveiled on July 23, 2012. It is located near the steps of the seawall that lead up to the Vancouver Convention Centre West Building in Coal Harbour.

A stamp commemorating the 100th anniversary of the arrival of Komagata Maru was released by Canada Post on May 1, 2014.

The first phase of the Komagata Maru Museum was opened in June 2012 at the Khalsa Diwan Society Vancouver Ross Street Temple.

Raj Singh Toor, spokesperson and vice-president of the Descendants of the Komagata Maru Society worked to bring about commemorations to the legacy of the Komagata Maru. Toor is a grandson of Baba Puran Singh Janetpura, one of the passengers on the Komagata Maru. After Toor spoke to Surrey, British Columbia city council, part of 75A Avenue in Surrey was renamed Komagata Maru Way on July 31, 2019. As well, a heritage storyboard titled "Remembering the Komagata Maru" was installed at R. A. Nicholson Park in Surrey on September 17, 2020. On December 23, 2020, as a result of Toor's presentations to Delta city council, a storyboard commemorating the Komagata Maru was installed in the North Delta Social Heart Plaza.

As well, due to lobbying efforts by Toor, May 23, 2020, was recognized by the city of Surrey and the province of British Columbia as Komagata Maru Remembrance Day. The city of New Westminster and city of Victoria declared May 23, 2021, as Komagata Maru Remembrance Day, while the city of Vancouver commemorated the day as Komagata Maru Day of Remembrance. The city of Burnaby and the city of Port Coquitlam proclaimed May 23 of every year as Komagata Maru Remembrance Day.

Governmental apologies 
In response to calls for the government of Canada to address historic wrongs involving immigration and wartime measures, the Conservative government in 2006 created the community historical recognition program to provide grant and contribution funding for community projects linked to wartime measures and immigration restrictions and a national historical recognition program to fund federal initiatives, developed in partnership with various groups. The announcement was made on June 23, 2006, when Prime Minister Stephen Harper apologized in the House of Commons for the head tax against Chinese immigrants.

On April 3, 2008, Ruby Dhalla, MP for Brampton—Springdale, tabled motion 469 (M-469) in the House of Commons which read, "That, in the opinion of the House, the government should officially apologize to the Indo-Canadian community and to the individuals impacted in the 1914 Komagata Maru incident, in which passengers were prevented from landing in Canada." On May 10, 2008, Jason Kenney, Secretary of State (Multiculturalism and Canadian Identity), announced the Indo-Canadian community would be able to apply for up to $2.5 million in grants and contributions funding to commemorate the Komagata Maru incident. Following further debate on May 15, 2008, Dhalla's motion was passed by the House of Commons.

On May 23, 2008, the Legislative Assembly of British Columbia unanimously passed a resolution "that this Legislature apologizes for the events of May 23, 1914, when 376 passengers of the Komagata Maru, stationed off Vancouver harbour, were denied entry by Canada. The House deeply regrets that the passengers, who sought refuge in our country and our province, were turned away without benefit of the fair and impartial treatment befitting a society where people of all cultures are welcomed and accepted."

On August 3, 2008, Harper appeared at the 13th annual Ghadri Babiyan Da Mela (festival) in Surrey, B.C., to issue an apology for the Komagata Maru incident. He said, in response to the House of Commons motion calling for an apology by the government, "On behalf of the government of Canada, I am officially conveying as prime minister that apology."

Some members of the Sikh community were unsatisfied with the apology because they expected it to be made in Parliament. Secretary of State Jason Kenney said: "The apology has been given and it won't be repeated".

The British Columbia Regiment (Duke of Connaught's Own), which was involved in the expulsion of the Komagata Maru, was commanded by a Sikh, Harjit Sajjan, from 2011 until 2014. He later became Minister of National Defence.

On May 18, 2016, Prime Minister Justin Trudeau gave a formal "full apology" for the incident in the House of Commons. This formal apology came about due to lobbying from the Indo-Canadian community, such as the work done by The Descendants of the Komagata Maru Society.

On May 18, 2021, due to lobbying efforts of Raj Singh Toor, Vancouver City Council said that they "sincerely apologize for the role the City played in the incident, especially supporting laws that prevented passengers from disembarking". Also due to lobbying efforts of Toor, New Westminster City Council acknowledged on September 27, 2021, that the city's "...formal support of discriminatory, racist and exclusionary legislation contributed to the plight of the passengers of the Komagata Maru, both in Canadian waters and upon their return to India." Consequently, "The City of New Westminster formally apologizes to the South Asian community and the descendants of the survivors of the Komagata Maru for its past actions which resulted in discrimination and exclusion."

Media
Jeevan Sangram is a 1974 Indian Hindi-language action-drama film directed by Rajbans Khanna. Based on the Komagata Maru incident it follows Arjun on board the ship and his return to India thereafter where he escapes the firing at the harbour and becomes a rebel against British rule in India.

The first Canadian play based on the incident is The Komagata Maru Incident, written by Sharon Pollock and presented in January 1976. It was presented again in 2017 by the Stratford Festival, directed by Keira Loughran, starring Kiran Ahluwalia.

The first Canadian novel based on the incident is Lions of the Sea, written by Jessi Thind and published in 2001. In 2011 Diana Lobb cited Lions of the Sea as one of the first fictionalized South Asian perspectives on the Komagata Maru in her philosophical dissertation presented to the University of Waterloo. Several friends of the author suggested the title of the novel for the Sikh Heritage Museum of Canada Komagata Maru exhibition in 2014 which was subsequently titled "Lions of the Sea: The National Komagata Maru Exhibition."

Ajmer Rode wrote the play Komagata Maru based on the incident in 1984. In 1989, when Indo-Canadian community of British Columbia commemorated the 75th anniversary of the Komagata Maru, Sadhu Binning and Sukhwant Hundal wrote a play Samundari Sher Nal Takkar (The Battle with the Sealion) and co-edited and produced first issue of Punjabi literary magazine Watan on the Komagata Maru incident. Phinder Dulai wrote A Letter To The Maru – 1914–1994. The letter was a fictionalized narrative utilizing both public record documentation and archival material; the piece ran in 1998 in an issue of Rungh Magazine.

Can You Hear the Nightbird Call? is a 2006 novel by the Indo-Canadian writer Anita Rau Badami, it follows a woman named Bibi-ji who retraces her father's steps during the incident in Canada, with the plot being linked with other contemporary issues in India. Oh Canada, Oh Komagata Maru is a 2012 play by Alia Rehana Somani which explores memories of the incident among the Indo-Canadian community.

In 2004, Ali Kazimi's feature documentary Continuous Journey was released. This is the first in-depth film to examine the events surrounding the turning-away of the Komagata Maru. The primary source research done for the film led to the discovery of rare film footage of the ship in Vancouver harbour. Eight years in the making, Continuous Journey has won over ten awards, including the Most Innovative Canadian Documentary at DOXA, Vancouver 2005, and a Golden Conch at the Mumbai International Film Festival, 2006. Also in 2006, Kazimi assisted broadcaster Jowi Taylor in obtaining a piece of red cedar from Jack Uppal's Goldwood Industries, the first Sikh-owned timber mill in British Columbia, as a way of bringing the Komagata Maru story and the story of Sikhs in Canada into the Six String Nation project. Parts of this wood now serve as kerfing strips on either side of the end block in the interior of Voyageur, the guitar at the heart of the project.

The CBC radio play Entry Denied, by the Indo-Canadian scriptwriter Sugith Varughese focuses on the incident.

In 2012, filmmaker Ali Kazimi's book Undesirables: White Canada and the Komagata Maru was published by Douglas & McIntyre.

In 2014, dream / arteries, written by Phinder Dulai, was published by Talon Books. The poetry book begins with a suite of poems that utilize archival records, public repositories, and online uploaded material never published before, including new photographs of the Komagata Maru from the Vancouver Public Library.

Simon Fraser University Library launched a website Komagata Maru: Continuing the Journey in 2012 funded by the Department of Citizenship and Immigration Canada under the auspices of the Community Historical Recognition Program (CHRP). This website contains information and documents related to the Komagata Maru incident and a timeline that unfolds the details and supports teaching, research and knowledge about the Komagata Maru for school-aged, post-secondary and general audiences.

See also
Human rights in Canada
Ukrainian Canadian internment
Anti-German sentiment in Victoria 1914
MS St. Louis, another vessel carrying immigrants denied entry to North America
MV Sun Sea incident
British protected person
Indo-Canadians in Greater Vancouver
Mewa Singh Lopoke

Notes

References

Bibliography

 Ferguson, Ted, A White Man's Country (Toronto: Doubleday Canada, 1975)
 Johnston, Hugh J.M., The Voyage of the Komagata Maru: the Sikh Challenge to Canada's Colour Bar. (Delhi: Oxford University Press, 1979)
 Josh, Sohan Singh, "Tragedy of the Komagata Maru" (New Delhi: People's Publishing House, 1975)
 Kazimi, Ali, Continuous Journey, feature-length documentary about the Komagata Maru. 2004
 
 McKelvie, B. A., "Magic, Murder and Mystery", (Duncan, B.C., Cowichan Leader, 1965)
 Morse, Eric Wilton. "Some Aspects of the Komagata Maru Affair." Canadian Historical Association Report (1936). p. 100-109.
 Reid, Robie L., "The Inside Story of the Komagata Maru" in British Columbia Historical Quarterly, Vol V, No. 1, January 1941, p. 4
 Report of the Komagata Maru Inquiry (Calcutta, 1914)
 Singh, Baba Gurdit, "Voyage of the Komagatamaru: or India's Slavery Abroad" (Calcutta; n.d.)
 Singh, Jaswant, "Baba Gurdit Singh: Komagatamaru" (Jullundur; New Book Co., 1965) [written in Gurmukhi]
 Singh, Kesar, Canadian Sikhs (Part One) and Komagata Maru Massacre. Surrey, B.C.: 1989.
 Singh, Malwindarjit, and Singh, Harinder, War against King Emperor: Ghadr of 1914–15: A verdict by special tribunal (Ludhiana: Bhai Sahib Randhir Singh Trust, 2001)
 Somani, Alia Rehana. "Broken Passages and Broken Promises: Reconstructing the Komagata Maru and Air India Cases" (PhD thesis) (Archive). School of Graduate and Postdoctoral Studies, University of Western Ontario, 2012.
 Ward, W. Peter, "The Komagata Maru Incident" in White Canada Forever: Popular Attitudes and Public Policy toward Orientals in British Columbia. Montreal: McGill-Queen's University Press, 2d ed., 1990, pp. 79–93
 Waraich, Malwinderjit Singh (ed.), Sidhu, Gurdev Singh (ed.), Komagata Maru: A Challenge to Colonialism Key Documents (Unistar Books, 2005)
 Whitehead, Eric, Cyclone Taylor: A Hockey Legend'' (Toronto; Doubleday Canada, 1977), pp. 158–163

External links 

Gallery on Komagata Maru incident  
Pioneer East Asian Immigration to the Pacific Coast: Komagata Maru
  Continuous Journey, a feature-length documentary by Ali Kazimi
 Photos: When these Indian immigrants got to Canada, police kept them on their boat for two months
  Lions of the Sea, a novel by Jessi Thind
 CBC Radio One's As It Happens aired an interview with Continuous Journey filmmaker Ali Kazimi on May 13, 2008
 "Tejpal Singh Sandhu was at Monday's meeting representing his great-grandfather Gurdit Singh Indian, who chartered the ship to travel from India to Canada."
 Komagata Maru: Continuing the Journey website by Simon Fraser University Library. A resource-rich website about the Komagata Maru story
  The Canadian Encyclopedia: "Komagata Maru" 
 Globe and Mail: Behind the Komagata Maru’s fight to open Canada’s border
 http://talonbooks.com/books/dream-arteries
 Descendants of the Komagata Maru Society Website, a site dedicated to educating people about the Komagata Maru Incident 

History of human rights in Canada
History of immigration to Canada
1914 in Canada
History of Vancouver
International maritime incidents
Maritime incidents in April 1914
Ocean liners
Anti-Indian sentiment in North America
Revolutionary movement for Indian independence
World War I passenger ships of Japan
Hindu–German Conspiracy
1914 in international relations
Post-Confederation Canada (1867–1914)
Maritime incidents in Canada
Immigration to British Columbia